Jenks Township is a township in Forest County, Pennsylvania, United States. The population was 3,545 at the 2020 census, down from 3,629 in 2010, a figure which was,, in turn, an increase from 1,261 in 2000 with the opening of the SCI Forest penitentiary. The township is the most populous municipality in all of Forest County.

The township was named for John W. Jenks, a county judge.

Geography
Jenks Township is in southeastern Forest County, bordered to the east and partially to the south by Elk County and partially to the southwest by Clarion County. Marienville is located near the center of the township. Pennsylvania Route 66 crosses the township from southwest to northeast, passing through Marienville. Pennsylvania Route 899 leads south from Marienville to Clarington in Barnett Township.

Demographics

As of the census of 2000, there were 1,261 people, 510 households, and 336 families residing in the township.  The population density was 14.9 people per square mile (5.8/km2).  There were 1,623 housing units at an average density of 19.2/sq mi (7.4/km2).  The racial makeup of the township was 98.41% White, 0.40% African American, 0.32% Native American, 0.08% Asian, and 0.79% from two or more races. Hispanic or Latino of any race were 0.56% of the population.

There were 510 households, out of which 23.1% had children under the age of 18 living with them, 55.3% were married couples living together, 8.0% had a female householder with no husband present, and 34.1% were non-families. 30.8% of all households were made up of individuals, and 14.3% had someone living alone who was 65 years of age or older.  The average household size was 2.28 and the average family size was 2.84.

In the township the population was spread out, with 19.2% under the age of 18, 4.4% from 18 to 24, 24.1% from 25 to 44, 29.0% from 45 to 64, and 23.2% who were 65 years of age or older.  The median age was 46 years. For every 100 females there were 87.6 males.  For every 100 females age 18 and over, there were 87.7 males.

The median income for a household in the township was $27,067, and the median income for a family was $32,273. Males had a median income of $26,683 versus $24,063 for females. The per capita income for the township was $15,131.  About 9.2% of families and 12.3% of the population were below the poverty line, including 15.6% of those under age 18 and 9.3% of those age 65 or over.

References

External links
Jenks Township official website

Populated places established in 1833
Townships in Forest County, Pennsylvania
1833 establishments in Pennsylvania